The N14 is a national route in South Africa which runs from Springbok in the Northern Cape to Pretoria in Gauteng. It passes through Upington, Kuruman, Vryburg, Krugersdorp and Centurion. The section between Pretoria and Krugersdorp is maintained by the Gauteng Provincial government and is also designated the P158.

Route

Northern Cape
The western terminus of the N14 begins in Voortrekker Street, Springbok, at an intersection with the R355, just next to its N7 off-ramp. It leaves the town towards the east, crossing under the N7 and then heads north-east past Carolusberg and through the Goegap Nature Reserve. After a considerable distance, it enters Pofadder from the west, intersecting the north/south R358 in the town centre. It leaves eastwards, then turns to the north-east towards Kakamas, entering the town from the west. It's intersected by the R359 in the town before leaving to the north, crossing the Orange River and then heading east until it intersects with the R27 in Keimoes. The N14 heads north out of the town. It continues north-east, following the Orange River, to Upington. In the town centre, it intersects with the N10 before continuing north-east to Olifantshoek and Kuruman, meeting the R385 and R325 routes. It passes through Kuruman as its main road, intersecting the R31. It leaves north-east and crosses into the North West province.

North West
Crossing into the province, the route is intersected at t-junction by the R371. The N14 continues east-north-east and enters Vryburg from the south-west, becoming the town's main road through the centre (Market Street) and crossing the N18 before leaving Vryburg to the east. Just outside the town, the road continues south-east cosigned with the R34 before the N14 turns north-east to Delareyville. Just outside the town, the R377 intersects from the left, while the N14 enters the town from the west. Briefly cosigned with the R507 it heads north through the town as its main road (Generaal Delarey Street). Leaving north-east, it passes the Barberspan Dam and nature reserve before passing through Roosville as its main road. The route goes north-east to Biesiesvlei, where the road meets the R52 before the N14 turns east, reaching the R505 as a t-junction. Briefly cosigned it turns right then left leaving the R505 continuing east and north-east to Coligny. Here it cosigns with the R503 and is the ring-road to the south of the town and then heads eastwards to Ventersdorp. The route bypasses the town to the south first crossing R30, the main road to the town and then the R53, as it leaves heading east again. Shortly after the village of Klerkskraal, it enters Gauteng province.

Gauteng
The N14 enters the province heading north-east, crossing the R500 and the western terminus of the R41 near the village of Holfontein. It continues north-east, later crossing the R24 south of the Tarlton International Raceway and north of the Krugersdorp Game Reserve, and then skirts the latter to its north. It bypasses north of the Krugersdorp CBD, intersecting the R563 and R540. At the major intersection at Cradlestone Mall, Krugersdorp, it meets the R28 that heads south-west to the town centre and the M47 Hendrik Potgieter Road that heads south-east to Roodepoort. The N14 turns north-east at this junction, becoming a dual carriageway with 2 lanes in each direction, crossing the Crocodile River, passing through Muldersdrift and crossing the R114. Shortly after Muldersdrift, there is major interchange with the M5 (Beyers Naude Drive) to Randburg and Johannesburg. The next interchange follows shortly where the R512 (Malibongwe Drive) crosses over it just south of Lanseria International Airport. Continuing north-east, it crosses the Jukskei River and later interchanges the R114 again and R511/R562 at Diepsloot, where it becomes 3 lanes in each direction. It soon takes an easterly direction, interchanging the R55 at Olievenhoutbosch, Centurion and shortly thereafter it meets the Brakfontein Interchange with the N1 (Ben Schoeman Freeway) in the southern suburbs of Centurion. The N14 and N1 switch highways, with the N1 now becoming the eastwards highway and the N14 now becoming the Ben Schoeman Freeway northwards, returning to being 2 lanes in each direction. It bypasses Centurion Central and intersects the M34 (Jean Avenue) at Die Hoewes and the M10/M24 near Lyttelton Manor. The next major interchange is with the M7 at the Groenkloof Nature Reserve near Fountains Valley. Shortly thereafter it ends in the southern suburb of Salvokop, Pretoria where it joins the R101 (Kgosi Mampuru Street) northwards, marking its eastern terminus.

History
The N14 is the only National Route in Gauteng that was not upgraded in 2010 and is the only National Route within Gauteng that is not a toll road on any part of its route.

In 2015 - 2017 the Highway was upgraded and re-tarred from Krugersdorp to Diepsloot. In 2017 - 2019 the section from Diepsloot to the Brakfontein Interchange was upgraded, upgrading that stretch from 2 lanes to 3 lanes in each dirctio. The upgrades are done by the Johannesburg Roads Agency (JRA) and the route remains toll-free.

Special Regulation 
The N14 highway has a 160 km section of the highway between Pofadder and Kakamas that allows a speed limit of 250 km/h for authorised vehicles for speed testing.

References

External links

 National Roads Agency SA

Highways in South Africa
National Roads in South Africa
Roads in South Africa